Miguel Ángel Mea Vitali (born February 19, 1981 in Caracas) is a Venezuelan former football midfielder.

Club career
Mea Vitali started his career with Caracas FC in his home town. He has played professional football in several countries in Europe and South America, including; UE Lleida in Spain, Poggibonsi in Italy, Chacarita Juniors in Argentina and Levadiakos in Greece.

International career
Mea Vitali has played 87 games for the Venezuela national team, scoring one goal.

International goals

|-
| 1. || June 28, 2000 || Pueblo Nuevo, San Cristóbal, Venezuela ||  || 1–0 || 4-2 || 2002 FIFA World Cup qualification
|}

References

External links

Footballdatabase.com profile
International statistics at rsssf.com
Stats at Liga de Fútbol Profesional 
FC Vaduz profile 

1981 births
Living people
Footballers from Caracas
Venezuelan people of Italian descent
Association football midfielders
Venezuelan footballers
Venezuela international footballers
1999 Copa América players
2001 Copa América players
2004 Copa América players
2007 Copa América players
Venezuelan Primera División players
Caracas FC players
UE Lleida players
U.S. Poggibonsi players
Chacarita Juniors footballers
Levadiakos F.C. players
UA Maracaibo players
FC Vaduz players
Aragua FC players
Asociación Civil Deportivo Lara players
Venezuelan expatriate footballers
Expatriate footballers in Liechtenstein
Expatriate footballers in Greece
Expatriate footballers in Spain
Expatriate footballers in Argentina
Expatriate footballers in Italy
Venezuelan expatriate sportspeople in Liechtenstein
Venezuelan expatriate sportspeople in Greece
Venezuelan expatriate sportspeople in Spain
Venezuelan expatriate sportspeople in Argentina
Venezuelan expatriate sportspeople in Italy